Glaucium grandiflorum, the great-flowered horned poppy, is a species of flowering plant in the horned poppy genus which is native to the Middle East.

Description 
The species is a perennial flowering plant which has scalloped, blue-gray leaves. These flowers are on long stems which extend above the plant's foliage. The seed pods ripen in late summer.

Glaucium grandiflorum grows  and can have one or more main stems. These stems are branched, and are covered with rather dense hairs. There are numerous stamens with anthers  in length. Their filaments are monotronic in the upper half and broadened in the lower half. The stigma are  broad.

Phytochemistry 
Numerous alkeloids have been isolated from the plant, including norchelidonine, dihydrochelerythrine, 8-acetonyldihydrochelerythrine, protopine, allocryptopine, corypalmine, and tetrahydropalmatine.

Taxonomy 
Glaucium grandiflorum has two accepted infraspecific varieties:

 Glaucium grandiflorum var. haussknechtii (Bornm. & Fedde) A. Parsa
 Glaucium grandiflorum var. iranicum B. Mory

Distribution and habitat 
Glaucium grandiflorum has a distribution from the Eastern Mediterranean to Iran.

Glaucium grandiflorum is found in disturbed habitats and shrub-steppes. It is found in the Irano-Turanian floristic region and is a glycophyte.

Gallery

References 

Papaveroideae